Baffa Pakhal is the fourth tehsil (an administrative subdivision) of Mansehra District in Khyber Pakhtunkhwa province of Pakistan.
. The capital of Baffa pakhal is  Baffa. Baffa Pakhal has at least 15 union councils, some of which are Dodial, Shinkiari, Suma Allimung, Schain, Jabar Daveli, Ichrian, Ail, Tanda, Baffa, Anayatabad, Hilkot, Tarangri Sabir Shah and Bugermung. Main language of the tehsil is Pashto followed by Gojri & Hindko.

References

Tehsils of Khyber Pakhtunkhwa
Populated places in Mansehra District